S25 can refer to:

Aircraft 
 Blériot-SPAD S.25, a French biplane
 Letov Š-25, a Czechoslovak biplane trainer
 Short S.25 Sandringham, a British flying boat airliner
 Short S.25 Sunderland, a British flying boat bomber
 Sikorsky S-25, a Russian biplane bomber
 Spalinger S.25, a Swiss training glider

Roads 
 County Route S25 (California)
 County Route S25 (Bergen County, New Jersey)
 New Jersey Route 413, numbered S25 until 1953

Rail and transit 
 S25 (Berlin), a line on the Berlin S-Bahn
 S25 (Long Island bus)
 S25 (ZVV), a line of the Zürich S-Bahn
 Niseko Station, in Hokkaido, Japan

Other uses 
 S-25 (rocket), a Soviet air-to-ground rocket
 40S ribosomal protein S25
 British NVC community S25, a swamps and tall-herb fens community in the British National Vegetation Classification system
 , a submarine of the Indian Navy
 S25: Avoid contact with eyes, a safety phrase
 S-25 Berkut, a Soviet surface-to-air missile system
 Siemens S25, a Siemens Mobile phone
 , a submarine of the United States Navy
 S25, a postcode district in Sheffield, England